Pygmalion is the third studio album by English rock band Slowdive, released on 6 February 1995 by Creation Records. It was the group's final album before their reformation in 2014, and their only album with Ian McCutcheon, who had replaced Simon Scott on drums.

Composition
A departure from Slowdive's previous two studio albums Just for a Day (1991) and Souvlaki (1993), Pygmalion features a more experimental sound tilted towards ambient electronic music, with sparse, atmospheric arrangements. Pitchforks Nitsuh Abebe described the album's songs as "ambient pop dreams" that are stylistically closer to post-rock than the band's trademark shoegaze style. BBC Music writer Wyndham Wallace viewed Pygmalion as a shoegaze album, albeit not in the traditional sense, noting that at points the record forgoes percussion "entirely".

With the exception of the lyrics for the songs "Miranda" and "Visions of LA", which were written by Rachel Goswell, Pygmalion was composed by Neil Halstead. The music on the album reflected Halstead's experimentation with digital technology and techniques such as looping, which was born out of his increased fascination with dance music.

Release
Pygmalion was released on 6 February 1995 by Creation Records. The cover illustration for the album, designed by Steven Woodhouse, features imagery from Rainer Wehinger's graphic notation for György Ligeti's 1958 work Artikulation. Though Slowdive had begun preparing for an expected tour of the United Kingdom in support of Pygmalion, a week after the album's release Creation dropped Slowdive from its roster, and by the end of the year the band had split.

The Sanctuary Records subsidiary label Castle Music issued a remastered edition of Pygmalion in 2005. Cherry Red Records issued another remastered edition of the album on 16 August 2010, with a bonus disc consisting of demo versions of Pygmalion-era tracks.

Critical reception and legacy

Pygmalion was largely overlooked by contemporary music critics. With the Britpop genre at the height of its popularity, Slowdive were seen as "past-their-sell-by-date shoegazers" by a music press who were more interested in covering the Britpop scene, according to journalist Kieron Tyler. NME critic John Harris wrote that Pygmalion represented a seeming act of "career suicide" by the band, for whom he composed a mock epitaph: "Slowdive... They could have had the world, but they decided to go all skeletal and wibbly and make sneakingly fascinating records that will sell absolutely fart all." More enthusiastic was Qs Andrew Collins, who said that "Pygmalion basks splendidly in its own sod-you resonant shapelessness." Caroline Sullivan of The Guardian was intrigued by the album's sound and quipped that it "should spark many a philosophy debate—after all, if music is this minimal, can it be said to exist at all?"

In a retrospective review for Pitchfork, Nitsuh Abebe called Pygmalion "a detour of the best sort", while in a separate appraisal for AllMusic, Abebe said that "for anyone who appreciates the indirect and intangible, it's a stylistic masterpiece." In his review for BBC Music, Wyndham Wallace wrote that Pygmalion "remains Halstead and Goswell's masterpiece", while Head Heritage writer Rust Phimister said that with the album, "Slowdive distilled the expansive aural atmospheres of Souvlaki to perfection." Trouser Press, however, found that Pygmalion "completely lacks all the tension, songwriting, sounds and power of the band's work, leaving only the spatial dimensions", deeming it "essentially a solo ambient recording" by Halstead "that should have been released under his own name".

The Pygmalion song "Blue Skied an' Clear" was featured in the 1995 film The Doom Generation; Gregg Araki, the film's director, is an avowed fan of Slowdive.

In 1999, critic Ned Raggett ranked Pygmalion at number 122 on his list of the best albums of the 1990s for Freaky Trigger. In 2016, Pitchfork listed it as the 12th best shoegaze album of all time. Pitchfork described Pygmalion as a "post-rock masterpiece" in a 2018 article that included quotes from several musicians professing appreciation for the record, including members of Low, The Twilight Sad, Deafheaven, Múm, A Place to Bury Strangers, Survive, and Girlpool.

Track listing

Personnel
Credits are adapted from the album's liner notes.

Slowdive
 Rachel Goswell – vocals, guitar
 Neil Halstead – vocals, guitar
 Christian Savill – guitar
 Nick Chaplin – bass guitar
 Ian McCutcheon – drums

Production
 Chris Hufford – production, engineering
 Slowdive – production, engineering

Design
 Steven Woodhouse – cover illustration

Charts

References

External links
 
 

1995 albums
Slowdive albums
Creation Records albums
Ambient albums by English artists
Post-rock albums by English artists